Josef Benedikt Engl (1867—1907), also known as J.B. Engl, was a German caricaturist and illustrator known for his work for the journal Simplicissimus.

Engl's Work

See also
 List of German painters

External links

References

German caricaturists
1867 births
1907 deaths